Ciénega de Escobar is a small village in the state of Durango, Mexico.

Sources

Populated places in Durango